Douglas Charles Blackwell is a retired Canadian Suffragan Bishop.

Blackwell was educated at Wycliffe College, Toronto  and ordained in 1964. After a curacy in Calgary he held incumbencies at Cochrane and North Battleford  He was Archdeacon of Saskatchewan from 1973 to 1974 when he came to the Diocese of Toronto, firstly as Executive Assistant to Bishop Lewis Garnsworthy and then as a suffragan bishop in the diocese.

References 

University of Toronto alumni
Anglican bishops of Toronto
20th-century Anglican Church of Canada bishops
Archdeacons of Saskatchewan